Nightside may refer to:
Nightside with Dan Rea, talk radio show hosted by Dan Rea
The Nightside, hosted by Mark Elliot
NBC Nightside, an American overnight television news program on NBC
Nightside (book series), a series of fantasy-noir novels by Simon Green
Nightside (comics), a fictional character in the Marvel Universe
Nightside (film), a 1980 television pilot starring Doug McClure
Night side of a planetary body, divided from the daylit side by the terminator (solar)